The  is the throne of the Emperor of Japan. The term also can refer to very specific seating, such as the  throne in the Shishin-den at Kyoto Imperial Palace.

Various other thrones or seats that are used by the Emperor during official functions, such as those used in the Tokyo Imperial Palace or the throne used in the Speech from the Throne ceremony in the National Diet, are, however, not known as the "Chrysanthemum Throne".

In a metonymic sense, the "Chrysanthemum Throne" also refers rhetorically to the head of state and the institution of the Japanese monarchy itself.

History

Japan is the oldest continuing hereditary monarchy in the world. In much the same sense as the British Crown, the Chrysanthemum Throne is an abstract metonymic concept that represents the monarch and the legal authority for the existence of the government.  Unlike its British counterpart, the concepts of Japanese monarchy evolved differently before 1947 when there was, for example, no perceived separation of the property of the nation-state from the person and personal holdings of the Emperor.

According to legend, the Japanese monarchy is said to have been founded in 660 BC by Emperor Jimmu; Emperor Naruhito is the 126th monarch to occupy the Chrysanthemum Throne. The extant historical records only reach back to Emperor Ōjin, regarded as the 15th emperor, and who is considered to have reigned into the early 4th century. 
 
In the 1920s, then-Crown Prince Hirohito served as regent during several years of his father's reign, when Emperor Taishō was physically unable to fulfill his duties. However, the Prince Regent lacked the symbolic powers of the throne which he could only attain after his father's death.

The current Constitution of Japan considers the Emperor as "the symbol of the State and of the unity of the people." The modern Emperor is a constitutional monarch. The metonymic meanings of "Chrysanthemum Throne" encompass the modern monarchy and the chronological list of legendary and historical monarchs of Japan.

Takamikura

The actual throne  is located in the Kyoto Imperial Palace. It is the oldest surviving throne used by the monarchy. The current model was built for the enthronement ceremony of Emperor Taisho in 1912. It is separated from the rest of the room by a curtain. The throne is used mainly for the enthronement ceremony, along with the twin throne . 

For the Enthronement of Emperors Akihito and Naruhito, both the Takamikura and Michodai thrones were taken apart, refurbished and reassembled at the Seiden State Hall of the Imperial Palace in Tokyo where the ceremonies are now held.

Other thrones of the Emperor 

The Imperial Throne of the Emperor of Japan was in the House of Peers from 1868 until 1912. The Emperor still uses the throne during ceremonies of the National Diet and for non-political statements. For example, he uses the throne during the Speech from the Throne ceremony in the House of Councillors. The ceremony opens ordinary Diet sessions (each January and after elections) and extra sessions (usually in autumn). The throne features real gold with immaculate details such as the 16 petal chrysanthemum seal, two lion heads, two phoenixes and the sun disc.

Rhetorical usage
This flexible English term is also a rhetorical trope. Depending on context, the Chrysanthemum Throne can be construed as a metonymy, which is a rhetorical device for an allusion relying on proximity or correspondence, as for example referring to actions of the Emperor as "actions of the Chrysanthemum Throne."  e.g.,

 referring to a part with the name of the whole, such as "Chrysanthemum Throne" for the mystic process of transferring Imperial authority—as in:
Shortly thereafter, Emperor Yōzei is said to have formally acceded to the throne.

 referring to the whole with the name of a part, such as "Chrysanthemum Throne" for the serial symbols and ceremonies of enthronement—as in:
 20 January 877 (Gangyō 1, on the 3rd day of the 1st month) Yōzei was formally installed on the Chrysanthemum Throne;  and the beginning of a new nengō was proclaimed.

 referring to the general with the specific, such as "Chrysanthemum Throne" for Emperorship or senso—as in:

 referring to the specific with the general, such as "Chrysanthemum Throne" for the short reign of Emperor Yōzei or equally as well for the ambit of the Imperial system.

During the 2007 state visit by the Emperor and Empress of Japan to the United Kingdom, the Times reported that "last night’s dinner was as informal as it could get when the House of Windsor entertains the Chrysanthemum Throne."

See also
Order of the Chrysanthemum
List of Emperors of Japan
Imperial Regalia of Japan
National seals of Japan
Imperial House of Japan
 National emblem
Dragon Throne of the Emperors of China
 Throne of England and the Kings of England
 Phoenix Throne of the Kings of Korea
 Lion Throne of the Dalai Lama of Tibet 
 Peacock Throne of the Mughal Empire (India)
 Sun Throne of the Persian Empire and Iran 
 Silver Throne – the Throne of Sweden
The Lion Throne of Myanmar

Notes

References
 Aston, William George. (1896). Nihongi: Chronicles of Japan from the Earliest Times to A.D. 697. London: Kegan Paul, Trench, Trubner. [reprinted by Tuttle Publishing, Tokyo, 2007.  (paper)]
 Brown, Delmer M. and Ichirō Ishida, eds. (1979). [ Jien, c. 1220], Gukanshō (The Future and the Past, a translation and study of the Gukanshō, an interpretative history of Japan written in 1219). Berkeley: University of California Press. 
 Martin, Peter. (1997).  The Chrysanthemum Throne: A History of the Emperors of Japan. Honolulu: University of Hawaii Press. 
 McLaren, Walter Wallace. (1916).  A Political History of Japan During the Meiji Era, 1867–1912.  London: G. Allen & Unwin. OCLC 2371314
 Ponsonby-Fane, Richard. (1959).  The Imperial House of Japan. Kyoto: Ponsonby Memorial Society. OCLC 194887
 Post, Jerrold and Robert S. Robins, (1995).  When Illness Strikes the Leader. New Haven: Yale University Press. 
 Titsingh, Isaac. (1834). Nihon Odai Ichiran; ou,  Annales des empereurs du Japon. Paris: Royal Asiatic Society, Oriental Translation Fund of Great Britain and Ireland.  OCLC 5850691
 Varley, H. Paul. (1980). A Chronicle of Gods and Sovereigns: Jinnō Shōtōki of Kitabatake Chikafusa. New York: Columbia University Press.

External links
 NYPL Digital Gallery:  Trono del imperator del Giapone. by  Andrea Bernieri (artist). Source: Ferrario, Giulio (1823). Il costume antico e moderno, o, storia del governo, della milizia, della religione, delle arti, scienze ed usanze di tutti i popoli antichi e moderni. Firenze : Batelli.

Japanese monarchy
National symbols of Japan
Thrones
660 BC
7th-century BC establishments
Individual thrones